Trematidae is an extinct family in the brachiopod superfamily Discinoidea.

References

Discinida
Brachiopod families